Piao Dongyi (born 11 May 1947) is a Chinese alpine skier. He competed in two events at the 1980 Winter Olympics.

References

External links
 

1947 births
Living people
Chinese male alpine skiers
Olympic alpine skiers of China
Alpine skiers at the 1980 Winter Olympics
Place of birth missing (living people)
20th-century Chinese people